Shin Hye-jeong (born 6 July 1992) is a South Korean field hockey player for the South Korean national team.

She participated at the 2018 Women's Hockey World Cup.

She won a gold medal as a member of the South Korean team at 2014 Asian Games.

References

1992 births
Living people
South Korean female field hockey players
Asian Games medalists in field hockey
Asian Games gold medalists for South Korea
Field hockey players at the 2014 Asian Games
Field hockey players at the 2018 Asian Games
Medalists at the 2014 Asian Games
Universiade gold medalists for South Korea
Universiade medalists in field hockey
Medalists at the 2013 Summer Universiade
20th-century South Korean women
21st-century South Korean women